Mary Hamm may refer to:

 Mary Hamm (archer) (born 1982), American archer
 Mary Hamm (tennis) (born 1954), American tennis player